John Jefferson De Haven (also given as de Haven and DeHaven) (March 12, 1845 – January 26, 1913) was a United States representative from California, an associate justice of the California Supreme Court and a United States district judge of the United States District Court for the Northern District of California.

Education and career

Born in St. Joseph, Buchanan County, Missouri, De Haven moved to California in 1853 with his parents, who settled in Humboldt County. He became a printer, and pursued that vocation for four years before he read law. In August 1865, he was a delegate from Humboldt County to the Union party state convention. He was admitted to the bar of the district court in Humboldt in 1866 and commenced practice at Eureka, California from 1866 to 1867. He was district attorney of Humboldt County from 1867 to 1869.

After entering the bar, De Haven held a series of public offices. He was a member from Humboldt County from 1869 to 1871 in the California State Assembly, and a member of the California State Senate from 1871 to 1875. He returned to private practice in Eureka from 1875 to 1884. He was the city attorney there from 1878 to 1880. He was an unsuccessful candidate for election in 1882 to the 48th United States Congress. He was a judge of the Humboldt County Superior Court from 1884 to 1889.

Congressional service

In November 1888, De Haven was elected as a Republican to the United States House of Representatives of the 51st United States Congress from the California's 1st congressional district, and served from March 4, 1889, until October 1, 1890, when he resigned.

Associate justice

De Haven was an associate justice of the California Supreme Court from December 18, 1890, to January 7, 1895, filling the unexpired term of Charles N. Fox. In June 1894, he lost a bid for renomination at the Republican convention. After stepping down from the court, he returned to private practice in Eureka between 1895 and 1897.

Federal judicial service

On June 1, 1897, President William McKinley nominated De Haven to a seat on the United States District Court for the Northern District of California vacated by Judge William W. Morrow, who had been elevated to the Ninth Circuit. De Haven was confirmed as a federal judge by the United States Senate on June 8, 1897, and received his commission the same day. He served on the federal bench until his death of apoplexy on January 26, 1913. His vacant seat was filled by the appointment of Judge Maurice Timothy Dooling. De Haven died in Yountville, California and was interred in Mount Olivet Cemetery in San Francisco, California.

Personal

On June 24, 1872, De Haven married Zeruiah Jane Ball (January 3, 1848 – January 23, 1918) in Humboldt, California. They had a daughter, Sadie De Haven, and son, Joseph J. De Haven.

See also
 List of justices of the Supreme Court of California

References

Sources

External links 
 
 John J. DeHaven. California Supreme Court Historical Society.
 

1845 births
1913 deaths
Justices of the Supreme Court of California
Superior court judges in the United States
Republican Party members of the California State Assembly
Republican Party California state senators
District attorneys in California
Judges of the United States District Court for the Northern District of California
United States federal judges appointed by William McKinley
Republican Party members of the United States House of Representatives from California
19th-century American politicians
19th-century American judges
People from St. Joseph, Missouri
United States federal judges admitted to the practice of law by reading law
U.S. state supreme court judges admitted to the practice of law by reading law
American printers